Mohammed Al-Mahasneh (born 13 July 1998) is a Saudi Arabian professional footballer who plays as a goalkeeper for Pro League side Damac.

Club career
Al-Mahasneh started his career at Mudhar. He joined Al-Ahli on 30 August 2013. On 15 January 2019, Al-Mahsneh left Al-Ahli and joined Portuguese side Fátima. On 11 July 2019, Al-Mahasneh joined Damac. On 20 November 2021, Al-Mahsneh made his debut and kept a clean sheet for Damac in the 1–0 win against Al-Fayha.

References

External links
 

1998 births
Living people
People from Dammam
Association football goalkeepers
Saudi Arabian footballers
Mudhar Club players
Al-Ahli Saudi FC players
C.D. Fátima players
Damac FC players
Saudi Professional League players
Saudi Arabian expatriate footballers
Saudi Arabian expatriate sportspeople in Portugal
Expatriate footballers in Portugal